Maurice J. Moyer (August 8, 1918 – March 6, 2012) was an African-American Christian minister from Delaware and a civil rights advocate who marched with Martin Luther King Jr.  In 1955, he started Delaware's first black Presbyterian church.

Biography 
Moyer was a native of Chattanooga, Tennessee. He was the son of Charles Raymond and Flora Adelia Moyer. At the age of 4, his family moved to Cleveland, Ohio, later returning to Chattanooga where he graduated from Howard High School. He served in the Navy from 1938 to 1945.

He attended Lincoln University, Lincoln Theological Seminary (graduated in 1949), and Princeton Seminary. He joined the Alpha Phi Alpha fraternity in 1947.

He founded the Community Presbyterian Church, the first black Presbyterian Church in Delaware, on Rogers Road in New Castle in 1955, and served as the church's pastor for 46 years, retiring in 1998. In 1963–1964, he was the first black moderator of the New Castle Presbytery.

Moyer fought against the Delaware Innkeepers Law, which allowed proprietors to refuse service to anyone; it was revoked in 1963. He was instrumental in getting the first African-American hired by Diamond State Telephone (now Verizon Delaware).

He died on March 6, 2012, at the Christiana Hospital. Upon his death, Governor Jack Markell ordered flags in Wilmington and New Castle County lowered in his honor.

Other roles 

 1960–1964: President of the Wilmington branch of the NAACP
Founder of the Metropolitan Wilmington Urban League
1965–1966: Program Coordinator of the Neighborhood Youth Corps under the Wilmington Board of Education
1966–1967: Project Director of Community Schools for New Castle County Department of Parks and Recreation
1967–1970: Career Coordinator at Bancroft Middle School
1970–1972: Administrator of the Layton Home for Aged Persons

Awards 

 1962: Omega Psi Phi Citizen's Award

Private life 
Moyer married Vivian Cleopatra on 13 October 1944. He had two sons: Thomas Jerome (1947) and Norman Gayraud (1950).

Places named after him 

 Maurice J. Moyer Academy: Professional training school in Wilmington

References

1918 births
2012 deaths
People from Chattanooga, Tennessee
African-American activists
African-American Christian clergy
American Christian clergy
21st-century African-American people